Cebocephaly (from Greek kebos, "monkey" + kephale, "head") is a developmental anomaly that is part of a group of defects called holoprosencephaly. Cebocephaly involves the presence of two separate eyes set close together and a small, flat nose with a single nostril (no nasal septum). It may be diagnosed before or after birth. It has a very poor prognosis, with most affected infants dying soon after birth. It is very rare, having been estimated to affect around 1 in 40,000 deliveries.

Signs and symptoms 
Cebocephaly causes:

 two separate eyes set close together
 a small, flat nose with a single nostril
 ear abnormalities
 mouth abnormalities (such as microstomia)

The presence of a nasal septum precludes a diagnosis of cebocephaly. Cebocephaly may cause malformations of the sphenoid and ethmoid bones behind the orbit.

Cause 
Cebocephaly can be caused by many factors, particularly genetic variations. These include 18p-, 14q deletion, 13q deletion, and some vertically transmitted infections. It is part of a group of defects called holoprosencephaly.

Diagnosis 
Before birth, cebocephaly may sometimes be diagnosed using ultrasound. After birth, cebocephaly is diagnosed based on the characteristic symptoms. A CT scan may be used to confirm the diagnosis.

Prognosis 
Most infants born with cebocephaly die soon after birth.

Epidemiology 
Cebocephaly is very uncommon. Some estimates of its prevalence include 1 in 40,000 neonatal deliveries.

History 
The word "cebocephaly" is derived from Greek kebos (monkey), and kephale (head).

See also 
 Cephalic disorder

References 

Congenital disorders of nervous system